The 2016 German Indoor Athletics Championships was the 63rd edition of the national championship in indoor track and field for Germany. It was held on 27–28 February at the Arena Leipzig in Leipzig – the sixth time the venue had hosted the championships. Local authorities in Leipzig supported the event with funding of 50,000 euros. A total of 24 events, 12 for men and 13 for women, were contested plus six further events were held separately. It was to serve as preparation for the 2016 IAAF World Indoor Championships.

Several national championship events were staged elsewhere: 3 × 800 m and 3 × 1000 m relays were held on 21 February at the Helmut-Körnig-Hallen in Dortmund alongside the German Indoor Youth Athletics Championships, while racewalking events were hosted at the Leichtathletikhalle Erfurt in Erfurt on 14 February alongside the German Indoor Masters Athletics Championships. Indoor combined events were held at the Leichtathletik-Halle in Hamburg on 30 and 31 January.

Results

Men

Women

References

Results
Gesamtergebnisse

German Indoor Athletics Championships
German Indoor Athletics Championships
German Indoor Athletics Championships
German Indoor Athletics Championships
Sports competitions in Leipzig